This is an index of lists about women.

Arts
Below are lists related to women in fine art, dance and design.

 List of 20th-century women artists
 List of Algerian women artists
 List of Argentine women artists
 List of Armenian women artists
 List of Australian women artists
 List of Austrian women artists
 List of Azerbaijani women artists
 List of women architects
 List of women artists in the Armory Show
 List of Belgian women artists
 List of Bosnia and Herzegovina women artists
 List of Brazilian women artists
 List of Canadian women artists
 List of Chilean women artists
 List of Chinese women artists
 List of female comics creators
 List of feminist art critics
 List of Colombian women artists
 List of Croatian women artists
 List of Cuban women artists
 List of Czech women artists
 List of female dancers
 List of Danish women artists
 List of Dutch women artists
 List of Egyptian women artists
 List of Emirati women artists
 List of English women artists
 List of Estonian women artists
 List of Filipino women artists
 List of Finnish women artists
 List of French women artists
 List of German women artists
 List of Greek women artists
 List of Hungarian women artists
 List of Icelandic women artists 
 List of Indian women artists
 List of Indian women in dance
 List of Iranian women artists
 List of Iraqi women artists
 List of Irish women artists
 List of Israeli women artists
 List of Italian women artists
 List of Jamaican women artists
 List of Japanese women artists
 List of Latvian women artists
 List of Lebanese women artists
 List of Lithuanian women artists
 List of female manga creators
 List of Macedonian women artists
 List of Mexican women artists
 List of Moroccan women artists
 List of New Zealand women artists
 List of Norwegian women artists
 List of Pakistani women artists
 List of Palestinian women artists
 List of women photographers
 List of Polish women artists
 List of Portuguese women artists
 List of prima ballerinas
 List of Romanian women artists
 List of Russian women artists
 List of female sculptors
 List of Scottish women artists
 List of Serbian women artists
 List of Slovak women artists
 List of Slovenian women artists
 List of South African women artists
 List of South Korean women artists
 List of Spanish women artists
 Women Surrealists
 List of Swedish women artists
 List of Swiss women artists
 List of Trinidad and Tobago women artists
 List of Turkish women artists
 List of Ukrainian women artists
 List of Uruguayan women artists
 List of Venezuelan women artists
 List of Welsh women artists
 List of women botanical illustrators

Business
 Forbes list of The World's 100 Most Powerful Women
 List of female billionaires
 List of women company founders
 List of female top executives
 List of women CEOs of Fortune 500 companies
 List of women in leadership
 List of women founders

Technology
 List of women in technology
 List of women computer scientists
 List of women electronic writers
 List of women innovators and inventors by country

Education
 List of female archivists
 List of female librarians

By alumni or faculty

 List of alumnae of women's colleges in the United States
 List of Barnard College people
 List of Mount Holyoke College people
 List of Old Collegians of PLC Melbourne
 List of Old Girls of PLC Sydney
 List of Radcliffe College people
 List of Wellesley College people

By student organizations

Below are lists related to notable women in sororities and similar student organizations.

 List of Alpha Kappa Alpha sisters
 List of Chi Omega sisters
 List of Delta Sigma Theta sisters
 List of Kappa Alpha Theta sisters
 List of Kappa Kappa Gamma sisters
 List of Pi Beta Phi sisters
 List of Zeta Phi Beta sisters

Ethnic or national origin

Below are lists related to notable women based on ethnic or national origin.
 List of Albanian women
 List of Ghanaian women
 List of Sami women
 List of Native American women of the United States
 List of Roman women

Halls of fame

 Alabama Women's Hall of Fame
 Alaska Women's Hall of Fame
 Arizona Women's Hall of Fame
 Colorado Women's Hall of Fame
 Connecticut Women's Hall of Fame
 Florida Women's Hall of Fame
 Georgia Women of Achievement
 Hall of Fame of Delaware Women
 List of American heiresses
 Iowa Women's Hall of Fame
 Kentucky Women Remembered
 Louisiana Center for Women and Government Hall of Fame
 Maine Women's Hall of Fame
 Maryland Women's Hall of Fame
 Michigan Women's Hall of Fame
 National Women's Hall of Fame
 New Jersey Women's Hall of Fame
 Ohio Women's Hall of Fame
 Oklahoma Women's Hall of Fame
 Oregon Women of Achievement
 Texas Women's Hall of Fame
 Victorian Honour Roll of Women

Fictional characters

 List of Bond girls
 List of catgirls
 List of female action heroes
 List of female detective characters
 List of female stock characters
 List of female supervillains
 List of fictional gynoids
 List of fictional princesses
 List of fictional witches
 List of tomboys in fiction
 List of women warriors in folklore
 Maternal mortality in fiction

Film and television
Below are lists related to notable women in film and television.
 List of female film and television directors
 List of female film directors
 List of female film score composers

Actresses

 Bollywood Movie Award – Best Female Debut
 List of American film actresses
 List of American television actresses
 List of Bengali actresses
 List of Chinese actresses
 List of Czech actresses
 List of Filipina actresses
 List of Indian film actresses
 List of Iranian actresses
 List of Italian actresses
 List of Japanese actresses
 List of Nepalese actresses
 List of nominees for the Academy Award for Best Supporting Actress (by actress)
 List of Thai actresses
 WAMPAS Baby Stars

Pornographic films
 AVN Female Performer of the Year Award
 List of pornographic actresses by decade

Gaming
 List of female chess players
 List of female role-playing game professionals

History

 List of English royal mistresses
 List of females executed in the United States
 List of female explorers and travelers
 List of female Nobel laureates
 List of female philosophers
 List of feminists
 List of French royal mistresses
 List of Kentucky women in the civil rights era
 List of prostitutes and courtesans
 List of Scottish royal mistresses
 List of suffragists and suffragettes
 List of Swedish royal mistresses
 List of U.S. counties named after women
 List of women firsts
 List of women in the Heritage Floor
 List of women who led a revolt or rebellion
 List of women's rights activists
 Women in piracy

Leadership
 List of women in leadership

Literature

 List of Albanian women writers
 List of Algerian women writers
 List of Argentine women writers
 List of Australian women writers
 List of Austrian women writers
 List of Azerbaijani women writers
 List of Bangladeshi women writers
 List of Belgian women writers
 List of Bolivian women writers
 List of Bosnia and Herzegovina women writers
 List of Brazilian women writers
 List of Bulgarian women writers
 List of Burkinabé women writers
 List of Canadian women writers in French
 List of Chilean women writers
 List of Chinese women writers
 List of Colombian women writers
 List of Croatian women writers
 List of Cuban women writers
 List of Czech women writers
 List of women cookbook writers
 List of Danish women writers
 List of Dutch women writers
 List of early-modern British women novelists
 List of early-modern British women playwrights
 List of early-modern British women poets
 List of ecofeminist authors
 List of Ecuadorian women writers
 List of Egyptian women writers
 List of Estonian women writers
 List of Faroese women writers
 List of female detective/mystery writers
 List of female linguists
 List of female poets
 List of female rhetoricians
 List of feminist poets
 List of Filipino women writers
 List of Finnish women writers
 List of French women writers
 List of German women writers
 List of Ghanaian women writers
 List of Greek women writers
 List of Guatemalan women writers
 List of Guyanese women writers
 List of Hungarian women writers
 List of Icelandic women writers
 List of Indian women writers
 List of Indonesian women writers
 List of Iranian women writers
 List of Irish women writers
 List of Italian women writers
 List of Ivorian women writers
 List of Jamaican women writers
 List of Japanese women writers
 List of Kenyan women writers
 List of Korean women writers
 List of Latvian women writers
 List of Lebanese women writers
 List of Luxembourg women writers
 List of Malaysian women writers
 List of Mexican women writers
 List of modernist women writers
 List of Moroccan women writers
 List of New Zealand women writers
 List of Nicaraguan women writers
 List of Nigerian women writers
 List of Norwegian women writers
 List of Pakistani women writers
 List of Palestinian women writers
 List of Panamanian women writers
 List of Paraguayan women writers
 List of Peruvian women writers
 List of Polish women writers
 List of Portuguese women writers
 List of Puerto Rican women writers
 List of Romanian women writers
 List of Russian women writers
 List of Senegalese women writers
 List of Serbian women writers
 List of Slovak women writers
 List of Slovenian women writers
 List of South African women writers
 List of Spanish women writers
 List of Swedish women writers
 List of Swiss women writers
 List of Trinidad and Tobago women writers
 List of Tunisian women writers
 List of Turkish women writers
 List of Ugandan women writers
 List of Ukrainian women writers
 List of Uruguayan women writers
 List of Welsh women writers
 List of women warriors in folklore
 List of women writers
 List of women electronic writers
 Women letter writers
 List of Zimbabwean women writers

Military
 List of female SOE agents
 List of WASP aviators
 Women's Royal Air Force List of Commandments and Directors

Models and pageants
 List of Allure cover models
 List of glamour models
 List of Japanese gravure idols
 List of The Price Is Right models
 List of Victoria's Secret models
 List of Vogue cover models

Pageants

 List of Miss America titleholders
 Miss America's Outstanding Teen
 Miss America award winners
 List of Miss USA titleholders
 List of Miss Teen USA titleholders
 List of Miss Universe titleholders
 Miss United States titleholders
 List of Miss World titleholders
 Miss World America titleholders
 List of Miss International titleholders
 Miss U.S. International titleholders
 List of Miss Earth titleholders
 Miss Earth United States titleholders
 Mrs. America titleholders
 Miss Teen America
 Miss Indian America
 Miss Hawaiian Tropic winners
 Miss American Beauty 1963
 Miss Brasil USA
 Miss LA Chinatown winners
 Miss Chinatown USA
 Miss Hollywood
 Miss Orlando
 Miss Teenage America
 National Sweetheart
 Queen of the Tournament of Roses, Rose Queens

Swimsuits and nudes
 List of Penthouse Pets of the Year
 List of Penthouse Pets of the Month
 List of Sports Illustrated Swimsuit Edition models
 List of Sports Illustrated Swimsuit Issue cover models
 List of Penthouse Pets
 List of Playboy models
 List of Playboy Playmates of the Month
 List of Playboy Playmates of the Year

Music

Below are lists related to notable women in the music industry.

 Grammy Award for Best Female Rap Solo Performance
 List of all-female bands
 List of Australian women composers
 List of best-selling girl groups
 List of classic female blues singers
 List of female bass guitarists
 List of women composers
 List of women composers by birth year
 List of women composers by name
 List of women composers in the United States during the 20th century
 List of female film score composers
 List of female classical conductors
 List of female drummers
 List of female electronic musicians
 List of female heavy metal singers
 List of female rock singers
 List of female violinists
 List of women music publishers before 1900
 MTV Pilipinas for Favorite Female Video
 MTV Video Music Award for Best Female Video

By ethnic or national origin
List of African-American women in classical music
 List of American female country singers
List of Australian women composers
List of Danish operatic sopranos
List of Finnish operatic sopranos
List of Norwegian operatic sopranos
List of Swedish operatic sopranos
 List of women singers from Lebanon

By genre

 Grammy Award for Best Female Rap Solo Performance
 List of classic female blues singers
 List of female electronic musicians
 List of female heavy metal singers
 List of female rock singers
 List of riot grrrl bands

Nurses
 List of nurses
 List of Danish nurses

Photography
Main list
 List of women photographers

By country

 List of American women photographers
 List of Australian women photographers
 List of Austrian women photographers
 List of British women photographers
 List of Canadian women photographers
 List of Chinese women photographers
 List of Danish women photographers
 List of Dutch women photographers
 List of French women photographers
 List of German women photographers
 List of Japanese women photographers
 List of Mexican women photographers
 List of New Zealand women photographers
 List of Spanish women photographers
 List of Swedish women photographers

Politics

 List of 19th-century women politicians
 List of elected or appointed female deputy heads of government
 List of elected or appointed female deputy heads of state
 List of elected or appointed female heads of government
 List of elected or appointed female heads of state
 List of female rulers and title holders
 List of the first female holders of political offices
 List of the first female holders of political offices in Africa
 List of the first female holders of political offices in Asia
 List of the first female holders of political offices in Europe
 List of the first female holders of political offices in Oceania
 List of the first female holders of political offices in the Americas
 List of first female mayors
 List of queens regnant
 List of Valide Sultans

By country of origin

 Countess of Tripoli
 Duchess of Braganza
 Duchess of Courland
 Duchess of Teschen
 Japanese empresses
 List of Albanian consorts
 List of Armenian consorts
 List of Bohemian consorts
 List of Bosnian consorts
 List of Bulgarian consorts
 List of Chinese consorts
 List of consorts of Luxembourg
 List of consorts Malaysia
 List of consorts of the Muhammad Ali Dynasty
 List of consorts of Schleswig and Holstein
 List of Cypriot consorts
 List of Danish consorts
 List of female cabinet ministers of Iceland
 List of female cabinet ministers of Indonesia
 List of female cabinet ministers of Israel
 List of female cabinet ministers of Japan
 List of female cabinet ministers of Sri Lanka
 List of female cabinet ministers of Taiwan
 List of female cabinet ministers of Thailand
 List of female cabinet secretaries of the Philippines
 List of female Indian chief ministers
 List of female Indian governors
 List of Finnish consorts
 List of Georgian consorts
 List of Haitian consorts
 List of Hawaiian consorts
 List of Holy Roman Empresses
 List of Hungarian consorts
 List of Lithuanian consorts
 List of Monegasque consorts
 List of Montenegrin consorts
 List of Norwegian consorts
 List of Polish consorts
 List of princess-abbesses of Quedlinburg
 List of Roman and Byzantine Empresses
 List of Russian consorts
 List of Serbian consorts
 List of Swedish consorts
 List of Thai royal consorts
 List of Tongan consorts
 List of Visigothic queens
 Lists of female state governors
 Princess of Antioch
 Princess of Liechtenstein
 Princess of Taranto

Australia

 List of female cabinet ministers of Australia
 Women in the Australian House of Representatives
 Women in the Australian Senate
 Women in the New South Wales Legislative Assembly
 Women in the New South Wales Legislative Council
 Women in the Queensland Legislative Assembly
 Women in the South Australian House of Assembly
 Women in the South Australian Legislative Council
 Women in the Tasmanian House of Assembly
 Women in the Tasmanian Legislative Council
 Women in the Victorian Legislative Assembly
 Women in the Victorian Legislative Council
 Women in the Western Australian Legislative Assembly
 Women in the Western Australian Legislative Council

Austria
 List of Austrian consorts
 List of consorts of Lorraine
 List of Modenese consorts

Belgium
 Duchess of Brabant
 Duchess of Limburg
 List of Belgian consorts
 List of consorts of the counts of Flanders
 Princess of Ligne

Brazil
 List of Brazilian consorts
 List of female state governors in Brazil
 List of spouses of the presidents of Brazil
 Princess of Brazil

Canada

 List of Canadian monarchs
 List of Canadian women government ministers
 List of consorts of Berg
 List of female first ministers in Canada
 List of female viceroys in Canada
 Women in Canadian provincial and territorial legislatures
 Women in the 39th Canadian Parliament
 Women in the 40th Canadian Parliament
 Women in the 41st Canadian Parliament

France

 Countess of Artois
 Countess of Eu
 Duchess of Berry
 Countess of Dreux
 Countess of Évreux
 Countess of Foix
 Duchess of Longueville
 Duchess of Rohan-Rohan
 Duchess of Vendôme
 List of Angevin consorts
 List of Aquitanian consorts
 List of Burgundian consorts
 List of consorts of Alençon
 List of consorts of Bourbon
 List of consorts of Brittany
 List of consorts of Elbeuf
 List of consorts of Étampes
 List of consorts of Guise
 List of consorts of Lorraine
 List of consorts of Maine
 List of consorts of Montpensier
 List of consorts of Neuchâtel
 List of consorts of Nevers
 List of consorts of Orléans
 List of consorts of Provence
 List of French consorts
 List of Navarrese consorts
 List of Norman consorts
 List of spouses of the President of France
 List of Toulousain consorts
 Princess of Condé
 Princess of Conti
 Princess of Joinville
 Princess of Soubise
 Princess of Turenne

Germany

 Countess of Hainaut
 List of Aquitanian consorts
 List of Bavarian consorts
 List of consorts of Baden
 List of consorts of Brandenburg
 List of consorts of Bremen-Verden
 List of consorts of Brunswick-Lüneburg
 List of consorts of Cleves
 List of consorts of Holstein-Gottorp
 List of consorts of Holstein-Sonderburg
 List of consorts of Lippe
 List of consorts of Lorraine
 List of consorts of Mayenne
 List of consorts of Mecklenburg
 List of consorts of Neuchâtel
 List of consorts of Oldenburg
 List of consorts of Schleswig and Holstein
 List of consorts of Schwarzburg
 List of consorts of Thurn and Taxis
 List of consorts of Württemberg
 List of Countesses of East Frisia
 List of Ferrarese consorts
 List of Frankish queens
 List of German queens
 List of Hanoverian consorts
 List of Hessian consorts
 List of Margravines of Meissen
 List of Modenese consorts
 List of Prussian consorts
 List of Rhenish consorts
 List of Saxon consorts
 List of Swabian consorts
 Princess of Leiningen

Greece
 List of exiled and pretending Byzantine Empresses
 List of Greek royal consorts
 Princess of Achaea

Ireland
 List of Irish queens and consorts
 List of women in Dáil Éireann
 List of women in Seanad Éireann

Italy

 Duchess of Aosta
 Duchess of Calabria
 Duchess of Galliera
 Duchess of Genoa
 List of consorts of Montferrat
 List of consorts of Montpellier
 List of consorts of Naples
 List of consorts of the Two Sicilies
 List of consorts of Tuscany
 List of countesses and duchesses of Urbino
 List of Ferrarese consorts
 List of Italian queens
 List of Mantuan consorts
 List of Milanese consorts
 List of Modenese consorts
 List of Parmese consorts
 List of Sardinian consorts
 List of Savoyard consorts
 List of Sicilian consorts
 Princess of Carignano
 Princess of Piedmont
 Wife of the President of the Italian Republic

Mexico
 List of female state governors in Mexico
 List of Mexican consorts

Netherlands
 Countess of Holland
 Duchess of Limburg
 List of consorts of the counts of Flanders
 List of Dutch consorts
 Princess of Orange

Portugal
 List of Portuguese consorts
 Princess of Portugal
 Princess Royal of Portugal

Romania
 List of consorts of Transylvania
 List of Romanian consorts

Spain

 List of Aragonese consorts
 List of Asturian consorts
 List of Castilian consorts
 List of Galician consorts
 List of Majorcan consorts
 List of Navarrese consorts
 List of Spanish consorts
 Princess of Asturias
 Princess of Girona

United Kingdom

 Blair Babe
 British princess
 British queens dowager
 English queens dowager
 List of British consorts
 List of Dames Commander of the Order of the British Empire
 List of English consorts
 List of Manx consorts
 List of Scottish consorts
 Princess Royal
 Princess of Wales
 Scottish queens dowager

United States

 First ladies of Puerto Rico
 List of California suffragists
 List of New Mexico suffragists
 List of Ohio suffragists
 List of Texas suffragists
 List of female governors in the United States
 List of female members of the House of Representatives of Puerto Rico
 List of female United States Cabinet members
 List of female United States presidential and vice presidential candidates
 Women in the United States House of Representatives
 Women in the United States Senate

Religion
 List of female mystics
 List of the first 32 women ordained as Church of England priests
 List of ordained Christian women
 List of women in the Bible
 List of women priests
 Women as theological figures

Science
 List of 21st-century women scientists
List of African-American women in STEM fields
 List of Antarctic women (explorers and researchers)
 List of female astronauts
 List of female Egyptologists
 List of female Fellows of the Royal Society
 List of female scientists before the 20th century
 List of female scientists before the 21st century
 List of female scientists in the 20th century
 List of female mathematicians
 List of New Zealand women botanists
 List of women anthropologists
 List of women astronomers
 List of women botanists
 List of women climate scientists
 List of women in mathematics
 List of women neuroscientists

Astronomy 

Astronomical objects named on a female theme:
 List of craters on Venus
 List of montes on Venus
 List of coronae on Venus

Health
List of African-American women in medicine
List of the verified oldest women
 List of women with ovarian cancer
 List of women who died in childbirth
 List of youngest birth mothers
 Pregnancy over age 50
 Pioneering women in medicine

Sports

 Alpine skiing World Cup women
 List of Australian athletics champions (Women)
 List of college women's lacrosse coaches with 250 wins
 List of college women's volleyball coaches with 700 wins
 List of European Athletics Championships medalists (women)
 List of female American football players
 List of female bodybuilders
 List of female fitness & figure competitors
 List of female kickboxers
 List of female mixed martial artists
 List of Hungarian women's handball transfers summer 2011
 List of Olympic medalists in athletics (women)
 List of Olympic medalists in canoeing (women)
 List of Olympic medalists in fencing (women)
 List of Olympic medalists in gymnastics (women)
 List of Olympic medalists in handball (women)
 List of Olympic medalists in rowing (women)
 List of sportswomen
 List of World Championships in Athletics medalists (women)
 List of World Curling Women's champions

Badminton
 List of All England Women's Doubles champions
 List of All England Women's Singles champions
 List of Denmark Open Women's Singles champions
 List of French Open Women's Singles champions in badminton
 List of Malaysia Open Women's Singles champions

Basketball

 List of college women's basketball coaches with 600 wins
 List of Connecticut Huskies women's basketball players with 1000 points
 List of Connecticut Huskies women's basketball players with 1000 rebounds
 List of current Women's National Basketball Association head coaches
 List of NCAA Division I women's basketball players with 1400 rebounds
 List of NCAA Division I women's basketball players with 3000 points
 List of WNBA career rebounding leaders
 List of WNBA career scoring leaders
 List of Women's Basketball Academic All-America Team Members of the Year
 List of Women's National Basketball Association players
 List of Women's National Basketball Association head coaches
 List of Women's National Basketball Association season assists leaders
 List of Women's National Basketball Association season rebounding leaders
 List of Women's National Basketball Association season scoring leaders

Boxing
 List of female boxers
 List of IBF female world champions
 List of WBA female world champions
 List of WBC female world champions
 List of WBO female world champions

Cricket

 Lists of women Test cricketers
 Lists of women One Day International cricketers
 Lists of women Twenty20 International cricketers
 List of women's Test cricket records
 List of women's One Day International cricket records
 List of women's Twenty20 International records
 List of centuries in women's Test cricket
 List of centuries in women's One Day International cricket
 List of centuries in women's Twenty20 International cricket
 List of players who have scored 1,000 or more runs in Women's Twenty20 International cricket
 List of women's Test cricketers who have taken five wickets on debut
 List of five-wicket hauls in women's One Day International cricket
 List of five-wicket hauls in women's Twenty20 International cricket
 List of women's international cricket hat-tricks

Cycling
 List of Olympic medalists in cycling (women)

Football

 African Women Footballer of the Year
 Diamantbollen
 International competitions in women's association football
 List of Austrian women´s soccer teams
 List of Boston Breakers (WPS) players
 List of college women's soccer coaches with 250 wins
 List of England women's international footballers (alphabetical)
 List of FC Gold Pride players
 List of France women's international footballers
 List of French women's football champions
 List of German women's football champions
 List of women's national association football teams
 List of New Zealand women's international footballers
 List of Seattle Reign FC players
 List of Vancouver Whitecaps Women players
 List of women's association football clubs
 List of women's association football players with 100 or more international goals
 List of women's association football clubs in England
 List of women's football clubs in Brazil
 List of women's football clubs in Hong Kong
 List of women's football clubs in Japan
 List of women's football clubs in Scotland
 List of women's football clubs in South Korea
 List of women's football clubs in Spain
 List of women's football clubs in Sweden
 List of women's football clubs in Turkey

Golf

 Chronological list of LPGA major golf champions
 List of American Solheim Cup golfers
 List of du Maurier Classic champions
 List of female golfers
 List of golfers with most LPGA Tour wins
 List of Kraft Nabisco Championship champions
 List of LPGA Championship champions
 List of LPGA major championship winning golfers
 List of Titleholders Championship champions
 List of U.S. Women's Open (golf) champions
 List of Women's British Open champions
 List of Women's Western Open champions
 Women's World Golf Rankings

Ice hockey

 List of Canadian women's national ice hockey team rosters
 List of college women's ice hockey coaches with 250 wins
 List of IIHF Women's World Championship Directorate award winners
 List of Olympic women's ice hockey players for Canada
 List of Olympic women's ice hockey players for Finland
 List of Olympic women's ice hockey players for the United States
 List of United States women's national ice hockey team rosters

Racing

 List of female 24 Hours of Le Mans drivers
 List of female Formula One drivers
 List of female Indy 500 drivers
 List of female NASCAR drivers

Swimming

 List of European Aquatics Championships medalists in swimming (women)
 List of European Short Course Swimming Championships medalists (women)
 List of Maccabiah medalists in swimming (women)
 List of Olympic medalists in swimming (women)
 List of Swedish Short Course Swimming Championships champions (women)
 List of Swedish Swimming Championships champions (women)
 List of World Aquatics Championships medalists in swimming (women)

Tennis

 Chronological list of women's Grand Slam tennis champions
 List of Australian Open women's singles champions
 List of Australian Open women's doubles champions
 List of female tennis players
 List of French Open women's singles champions
 List of French Open women's doubles champions
 List of Grand Slam women's doubles champions
 List of Grand Slam women's singles champions
 List of open era Grand Slam women's singles finals
 List of US Open women's singles champions
 List of US Open women's doubles champions

Wrestling
 List of female freestyle wrestlers
 List of TNA Knockouts Champions
 List of WWE Divas Champions
 List of WWE Women's Champions
 List of women's wrestling promotions in the United States

Other
 List of incidents of violence against women
 List of women's conferences
 List of women's organizations